Phyllodesmium serratum is a species of sea slug, an aeolid nudibranch, a marine gastropod mollusc in the family Facelinidae.

Distribution 
The distribution of Phyllodesmium serratum includes Australia and Japan. It has been erroneously synonymised with Phyllodesmium horridum by some authors but does not occur in Africa.

Description 
The length of the slug is usually 10–25 mm, but its length can reach up to 40 mm.

This species contains no zooxanthellae.

Ecology 
Phyllodesmium serratum feeds on the soft corals Cornularia sp., Clavularia sp., Carijoa sp. and Steronephthya sp.

References

Facelinidae
Gastropods described in 1949